The Gerrish Peaks are a line of eroded rock peaks standing  southeast of Hunt Bluff on the west side of Bear Peninsula, Walgreen Coast, Marie Byrd Land, Antarctica. The feature was first photographed from the air by U.S. Navy Operation Highjump in January 1947, and was named by the Advisory Committee on Antarctic Names after Samuel D. Gerrish, an ionospheric physics researcher at Byrd Station, 1966.

References

Mountains of Marie Byrd Land